Suicide Squeeze Records is a Seattle, Washington-based independent record label that releases rock, pop, and metal music. Suicide Squeeze releases content on vinyl, CD, cassette, and digital. The label has also released comedy and performance art CD and DVDs.

Founded in 1996 by David Dickenson, it got its start releasing singles by artists such as Elliott Smith and Modest Mouse. Current artists include The Coathangers, L.A. Witch, Nü Sensae, This Will Destroy You, Audacity, Guantanamo Baywatch, White Woods, and Yamantaka // Sonic Titan.

In the spring of 2014, Oregon-based Fort George Brewery and Suicide Squeeze created the craft beer "Suicide Squeeze IPA."

In recent years, Suicide Squeeze has released music by L.A. Witch, Ty Segall, This Will Destroy You, cumgirl8, Minus the Bear, Michael Nau (of Cotton Jones), and The Coathangers.

History

Founding, early releases
Suicide Squeeze Records was started in August 1996 in Seattle, Washington by owner David Dickenson. After the initial release of a 7" single from Seattle band 764-Hero, the label quickly grew from Dickenson's full-time hobby to a cottage industry by the late-1990s. By 1997 the label had released singles by popular Northwest artists Modest Mouse and Elliott Smith. The label has also released comedy and performance art CD and DVDs, and continues to press a significant number of releases on vinyl.

In an interview with The Stranger, Dickenson said "A highlight of those early days for me was our first 746-HERO release under my belt. Getting to work with David Bazan. And Modest Mouse was a big one. Isaac [Brock, singer/guitarist of Modest Mouse] used to come into Hot Lips, a pizza place that I worked at on the Ave, and he’d be selling these dial-a-song cassettes. He basically was just going to the dumpsters behind the Muzak office, pulling the discarded tapes, making his own artwork, and selling them."

2000–2009
In August 2003, Suicide Squeeze put out a limited-edition vinyl single for "Pretty (Ugly Before)", a song that Elliott Smith had been playing since his Figure 8 tour. Shortly afterwards in 2004, the label released a spoken CD by Eugene Mirman, a Russian-born American comedian and writer. The Absurd Nightclub Comedy of Eugene Mirman was also released on DVD, and was voted one of the Best Albums of 2004 by both The A.V. Club and Time Out New York.

Goon Moon, an American rock band composed of Jeordie White (also known as Twiggy Ramirez from Marilyn Manson) and Chris Goss, released a mini-LP on Suicide Squeeze called I Got a Brand New Egg Layin' Machine in 2005. Chin Up Chin Up was an American indie pop band from Chicago, who released This Harness Can't Ride Anything on October 10, 2006 on Suicide Squeeze. Also in 2006, Canadian rock band Black Mountain released their "Stormy High" single and EP on Suicide Squeeze.

In 2006, to celebrate their tenth anniversary, the label released the compilation album Suicide Squeeze Records: Slaying Since 1996.

 Minus the Bear is an indie rock band from Seattle, whose sound has been described as "Pele-esque guitar-taps and electronics with sophisticated time signature composition." Interpretaciones del Oso, an album of remixed songs from their second full-length album Menos el Oso, was released on February 20, 2007 through Suicide Squeeze, who also released the band's third full-length album, titled Planet of Ice, on August 21, 2007. In 2017, Minus the Bear released their sixth-studio album VOIDS on Suicide Squeeze.

Page France was an American indie folk-pop music band that played melodic and emotional music. Their last record deal was with Suicide Squeeze, before the disbandment in 2008. Their second album, Hello, Dear Wind, was re-released by Suicide Squeeze. Page France's last album and third full-length, …and the Family Telephone, was released May 8, 2007 on Suicide Squeeze.

For their third studio album, These Arms Are Snakes signed to Suicide Squeeze. Tail Swallower and Dove was released in October 2008. The album was seen as a departure from their more hardcore-sounding songs and took a more experimental approach, and also more traditional song structures.

On January 27, 2009, The Cotton Jones Basket Ride released their second LP, and their debut for Suicide Squeeze Records, Paranoid Cocoon.  It was described as a "weepy, reverb-drenched blend of Pacific Northwest, 1960s folk-pop, and heartland rock." On August 24, 2010, the band released their third LP, Tall Hours in the Glowstream.  It was described as "classic country music filtered through a dream-pop haze."

2009–present

This Will Destroy You released the albums Tunnel Blanket on Suicide Squeeze, as well as the "Black Dunes" 7" single. Tunnel Blanket was released in May 2011, and it entered the Billboard Heatseekers Album Chart at number 25.

The Coathangers are a punk group from Atlanta, Georgia. After putting out a 7" on Suicide Squeeze in 2011, they released their third album, Larceny and Old Lace for Suicide Squeeze, to generally positive reviews. In 2012, Julia Kugel of The Coathangers released a 7" record on Suicide Squeeze, under the name "White Woods.". Other releases by The Coathangers on Suicide Squeeze include Suck My Shirt (2014), Nosebleed Weekend (2016), Perfume/Watch Your Back 7" (2016), Parasite EP (2017).

Nü Sensae is a Vancouver, British Columbia, punk and grunge trio. Their second album, "Sundowning", was released on August 7, 2012 via Suicide Squeeze and was given an 8.0 rating by Pitchfork Media.UZU by performing art collective Yamantaka // Sonic Titan was released on Suicide Squeeze in 2013.

In 2015, Suicide Squeeze released Portland-based punk trio Guantanamo Baywatch's third studio album Darling...It's Too Late''.

In 2016, Suicide Squeeze celebrated its 20th anniversary by releasing a digital compilation Suicide Squeeze: 20 Years including Elliott Smith, Minus the Bear, La Luz, King Tuff and more.

In 2017, Suicide Squeeze released music by Ty Segall, This Will Destroy You, Minus the Bear, Michael Nau (of Cotton Jones), and The Coathangers. The label also signed Los Angeles-based trio L.A. Witch for the release of their debut album out September 8, 2017.

Partnerships
In the spring of 2014, the label worked with Oregon-based Fort George Brewery to create the craft beer "Suicide Squeeze IPA."

Artists

Current

Audacity
Childbirth (band)
The Coathangers
David Bazan
Death Valley Girls
Guantanamo Baywatch
L.A. Witch
Minus the Bear
Michael Nau
Nü Sensae
The Paranoyds
SadGirl 
Shana Cleveland & The Sandcastles
Sun Breaks
This Will Destroy You
Ty Segall
VHS
White Woods
Yamantaka // Sonic Titan

Past

764-HERO
The Aislers Set
Antwon
Aspera
Julianna Barwick
The Black Heart Procession
The Black Keys
Black Moth Super Rainbow
Black Mountain
Bleached
Alison Chesley
Chin Up Chin Up
The Constantines
Cotton Jones
Crystal Skulls
Davilla 666
Destruction Unit
Dirty Beaches
Earlimart
Gap Dream
Heavy Cream
Page France
Goon Moon
Headphones
HEALTH
Hella
Zach Hill
Hint Hint
 Holy Other
Human Highway
Iron & Wine
JEFF the Brotherhood
 King Tuff
La Luz
Lil B
The Magic Magicians
Meat Market
Metal Hearts
Melvins
Memoryhouse
Eugene Mirman
Modest Mouse
Natural Child
Nobunny
The Numerators
Of Montreal
Past Lives
Peace
Pedro the Lion
Pennsy's Electric Workhorses Songs
Red Stars Theory
Russian Circles
Shannon and the Clams
S
sBACH
The Scenic Vermont
School of Seven Bells
The Six Parts Seven
Elliott Smith
Tammar
These Arms are Snakes
Track Star
The Unicorns
Wax Idols
We Ragazzi

Discography

See also 
 List of record labels

References

Further reading

External links

 
Record labels established in 1996
American independent record labels
Alternative rock record labels
Indie rock record labels
Music of Seattle
1996 establishments in Washington (state)